Ergun (Ergün), formerly Ergun Right Banner ( Эргүнэ хот), is a county-level city in Hulunbuir, Inner Mongolia, containing the autonomous region's northernmost point.

History 
For most of its history, the region of present-day Ergun has not been controlled by Chinese states. The area first came under Chinese control during the Qing dynasty, when it was administered as part of Hulunbuir.

In 1908, the Jilalin Administrative Bureau was established to govern the area.

In 1920, the area was re-organized as the Qigan Administrative Bureau, but the area was re-organized again in 1921 as Qigan County.

In 1933, the area was re-organized as Ergun Right Banner. In 1994, Ergun Right Banner was abolished and the county-level city of Ergun was established.

21st century 
By 2000, the city administered five towns, one township, and two ethnic townships. In 2001, the city was restructured to administer one subdistrict, two towns, one township, and two ethnic townships.

In 2011, Shiwei Russian Ethnic Township was abolished and Enhe Russian Ethnic Township and Mengwu Shiwei Sum were established.  was also established.

In 2013,  was established.

Geography

Administratively, Ergun is part of the prefecture-level city of Hulunbuir, and spans 11.4% of Hulunbuir's area. It occupies , bounded to the north and west by the Argun River, which forms China's border with Russia's Zabaykalsky Krai (formerly, Chita Oblast). The city's border with Russia spans . Ergun is also bordered by Genhe to the east, and the county-level city of Mohe in Heilongjiang to the northeast.

The city stands at the foothills of the Greater Khingan Mountains. 73.4% of the city's area is forested, with much of it being virgin forests. 17% of the city's area is natural grassland, particularly in the city's south, and 6% is cultivated.

Ergun Wetlands

After the end of September the wetlands wither and turn dark. A panoramic view of the wetlands is afforded from a tourist scenic view overlooking the area from a hill 720 meters above sea level.

The encroachment of urban development has made preservation of the wetland difficult but were bolstered by a wetland protection law in 2012.

Climate 

Administration 

Subdivisions
Ergun is divided into two subdistricts, three towns, one township, two ethnic townships, one sum, and four township-level farms.

Demographics
Ergun is one of the least populated county-level divisions of Inner Mongolia, with a population of 79,155 as of 2019, making it the 87th most populated of the autonomous region's 103 divisions. This figure reflects a 1.0% decline from the 2018 population of 79,942. As of 2010, Ergun had a population of 76,667.

Ethnicity 

In Ergun's towns and villages along the Argun River are thousands of descendants of intermarriages between Han Chinese men and Russian women. This Russian descended population forms a large portion of the total number of Russians in China. One of these locations is Enhe Russian Ethnic Township, the sole official ethnic Russian township.

Economy 
Ergun's gross domestic product was ¥4.059 billion as of 2019, and ¥4.519 billion as of 2018. As of 2018, 42.1% of the city's gross domestic product came from its primary sector, 11.1% came from its secondary sector, and 46.8% came from its tertiary sector. The city's public budget revenue in 2019 was ¥150.55 million, ranking 91st out of Inner Mongolia's 103 county-level divisions. Its consumer retail sales totaled ¥1.826 billion, and its foreign trade totaled 56.32 million USD.

The average household disposable income of Ergun's residents totaled ¥30,371 in 2019, a 7.8% increase from the ¥28,173 reported in 2018. For urban households, this number stood at ¥30,953 in 2019, a 7.0% increase from the ¥28,928 reported in 2018, which ranked 75th of the 101 county-level divisions in Inner Mongolia for which this statistic was reported. Rural households in Ergun average ¥28,470 in disposable income as of 2019, a 10.0% increase from 2018, which ranked the 3rd highest of the 90 county-level divisions in Inner Mongolia which reported this statistic.

As of 2019, there are 99,140 mobile telephone subscriptions in Ergun (1.25 per capita), and 28,962 internet subscriptions (0.37 per capita).

Mineral deposits in Ergun include coal, gold, lead, zinc, iron, tungsten, copper, and fluorite.

Agriculture 
The total value of Ergun's agriculture, forestry, animal husbandry, and aquaculture industry as of 2018 was ¥3.072 billion.

In 2019, Ergun produced 263,482 tons of grain, the 37th most of the 96 county-level divisions of Inner Mongolia which reported this statistic. The city produced 9,255 tons of meat the same year, ranking 74th of Inner Mongolia's 103 county-level divisions.

Tourism 
Ergun has a significant tourism industry, attracting 5.733 million tourists in 2019 alone.

The Ergun Wetland Scenic Area is designated as a AAAA Tourist Attraction.

Enhe Russian Ethnic Township has become a major tourist destination in recent years, attracting about 500,000 tourists in 2017 alone. Much of the town's tourism is derived from its small rural character, as well as its unique intersection of Russian and Chinese culture. Due to the cold climate of the region, most of the ethnic township's tourism takes place in summer months.

Education 
As of 2019, the city has 10 primary schools and 5 secondary schools.

Secondary schools include:
 Ergun City No. 2 Secondary School (额尔古纳市第二中学)
 Ergun City No. 3 Secondary School (额尔古纳市第三中学)
 Ergun City Moridaga Secondary School (额尔古纳市莫尔道嘎中学)
 Ergun City Sanhe Secondary School (额尔古纳市三河中学)

Primary schools include:
 Ergun City No. 1 Primary School (额尔古纳市第一小学)
 Ergun City No. 2 Primary School (额尔古纳市第二小学)
 Ergun City No. 3 Primary School (额尔古纳市第三小学)
 Ergun City Enhe Primary School (额尔古纳市恩和小学)
 Ergun City Heishantou Primary School (额尔古纳市黑山头小学)
 Ergun City Moridaga Primary School 1 (额尔古纳市莫尔道嘎一小)
 Ergun City Sanhe Primary School (额尔古纳市三河小学)
 Ergun City Shangkuli Primary School (额尔古纳市上库力小学)
 Ergun City Shiwei Primary School (额尔古纳市室韦小学)
 Ergun City Suqin Primary School (额尔古纳市苏沁小学)

Healthcare 
As of 2019, Ergun's medical institutions have 414 beds, and are staffed by 597 personnel.

Transportation 
Ergun hosts  of highway as of 2019. Inner Mongolia Provincial Highway 201 and Inner Mongolia Provincial Highway 301 both run through Ergun.

References

 
Cities in Inner Mongolia
County-level divisions of Inner Mongolia
Hulunbuir